Unknown Path (Spanish:Senda ignorada) is a 1946 Spanish crime film directed by José Antonio Nieves Conde and starring Enrique Guitart, Alicia Palacios and Fernando Nogueras.

Cast

References

Bibliography 
 D'Lugo, Marvin. Guide to the Cinema of Spain. Greenwood Publishing, 1997.

External links 
 

1946 crime films
Spanish crime films
1946 films
1940s Spanish-language films
Films directed by José Antonio Nieves Conde
Spanish black-and-white films
1940s Spanish films